Bloodlove is a 2006 album by the band Mercy Killers.  The album features both punk and gothic influences.

Track listing
 "Hollow"
 "Pamint De Mort"
 "Lust For Hope"
 "Wash Over Me"
 "As Far Apart"
 "I'm Not Wasted"
 "Bloodlove"
 "End Transmission"
 "Pure Life"
 "Not About You"

Personnel
Craig Fairbaugh – Vocals/Guitar
Sam Soto – Bass Guitar/Vocals
Colin Berrill – Drums

References

2006 debut albums